A winter garden is a garden where winter-hardy plants are grown for winter decoration or to be harvested for food between winter and early spring.

Winter Garden(s)  may also refer to:

Gardens and other landmarks 
 Auckland Domain Wintergardens, Auckland Domain, Auckland, New Zealand
 People's Palace and Winter Gardens, a museum and glasshouse in Glasgow, Scotland, United Kingdom
 Springburn Winter Gardens, a large derelict glasshouse constructed in 1900 in Glasgow, Scotland, United Kingdrom
 Renaissance Center Wintergarden in Detroit, Michigan, United States
 Sunderland Museum and Winter Gardens, a museum and modern glasshouse in Sunderland, North East England, United Kingdom
 The Winter Garden commissioned by Ludwig II of Bavaria on the roof of the Munich Residenz
 Winter Gardens (Bordighera), created by botanist Ludwig Winter in Bordgihera, Italy
 The Wintergarden, a former indoor arboretum in downtown Niagara Falls, New York, United States
 Winter Garden (Helsinki), a botanical garden in Helsinki, Finland
 Winter Garden at Exposition Hall, a skating rink in Pittsburgh, Pennsylvania, United States
 Winter Garden Atrium, a large public atrium in the World Financial Center in New York City, New York, United States
 Wintergarden, Brisbane, shopping centre in Brisbane, Queensland, Australia
 Winter Garden, Sheffield, one of the largest temperate glasshouses in the United Kingdom

Places 
 Winter Garden, Florida, city located west of Orlando, Florida, United States
 Winter Garden Region, agricultural region in southern Texas, United States
 Winter Gardens, California, neighborhood in the unincorporated community of Lakeside in San Diego County, California, United States
 Winter Gardens, Essex, England, see Castle Point#Places in Castle Point district

Theatres

Canada 
 Elgin and Winter Garden Theatres, Toronto, Ontario

United Kingdom 
 Bournemouth Winter Gardens
 Morecambe Winter Gardens
 Winter Gardens, Blackpool, a complex of theatres and conference facilities
 Winter Gardens (Cleethorpes), a former entertainment venue
 Winter Gardens, Great Yarmouth
 Winter Gardens, Southport
 Winter Gardens Pavilion, Weston-super-Mare
 Winter Garden Theatre, London, on a site now occupied by the New London Theatre

United States 

 The Winter Garden Theatre (1850) at 624 Broadway, New York City; opened in 1850 and demolished in 1867
 The Olympia Theatre (New York City), also known as the Winter Garden Theatre, at 1514–16 Broadway, New York City; opened in 1895 and demolished in 1935
 The current Winter Garden Theatre at 1634 Broadway, New York City; opened in 1911

Other uses 
 Winter Garden (album), a 2015 South Korean compilation of Christmas songs
 Winter Garden (anime), a 2006 spin-off from Di Gi Charat
 Winter Garden, a 1980 novel by Beryl Bainbridge